Ken Isaacs (7 February 1927 – 8 June 2016), born in Peoria, Illinois, was an American designer. He is known for his creation of a matrix-based modular system to build living structures.

Isaacs described in 1974 how to build modular houses in a book called How to Build Your Own Living Structures. He was head of the Design Department at the Cranbrook Academy of Arts from 1956 to 1958. He maintained a design office and apartment in New York City between 1956 and 1972, often commuting from Bloomfield Hills, Michigan.

In 2019, a retrospective biography of Isaacs was written by Susan Snodgrass, who worked with him to exhibit his work during his lifetime. The book, Inside the Matrix: The Radical Designs of Ken Isaacs, was partially funded by the Graham Foundation for Advanced Studies in the Fine Arts.

References

External links
 
Walker Art Center - Enter the Matrix: An Interview with Ken Isaacs
Walker Art Center - Hippie Modernism: The Struggle for Utopia, Oct 24, 2015–Feb 28, 2016
Cranbrook Academy of Art - Cranbrook Mourns the Loss of Ken Isaacs
Cranbrook Art Museum - Culture Breakers: The Living Structures of Ken Isaacs, June 21, 2014 - October 5, 2014
College of Architecture, Design and the Arts, University of Illinois at Chicago - Architecture Professor Emeritus Ken Isaacs 1927-2016
Archive.org - Ken Isaacs, How to Build Your Own Living Structures (1974)

1927 births
2016 deaths
American designers
Artists from Peoria, Illinois